This is a list of French electric companies :
Alterna énergie
ekWateur
EDF
Enercoop
Énergem
Engie
Lampiris
Planète Oui
Plüm Énergie
Total Direct Énergie

References

See also 

 Lists of public utilities

 Utilities
France distribution
Electric
Electric Companies